The Strachan Challenge Series – Event 3 was a professional minor-ranking snooker tournament, that was held from 1 to 6 February 1993 at the Jimmy White Snooker Lodge in Aldershot, England.

The event was the final of three held in an effort to encourage some of the hundreds of new professionals who had joined the tour. These minor ranking events were open to all the pros but carried a much lower ranking points tariff, around ten per cent of that applicable to most of the other tournaments.
 
Tony Drago won the tournament by defeating Ken Doherty nine frames to seven in the final.


Main draw

References

1993 in snooker